This is a list of hospitals in Balıkesir Province, Turkey.

State hospitals
Ayvalık Devlet Hastanesi
Balıkesir Devlet Hastanesi
Balıkesir Göğüs Hastalıkları Hastanesi
Bandırma Devlet Hastanesi
Bigadiç Devlet Hastanesi
Burhaniye Devlet Hastanesi
Dursunbey Devlet Hastanesi
Edremit Devlet Hastanesi
Gönen Devlet Hastanesi
Sındırgı Devlet Hastanesi
Susurluk Devlet Hastanesi

Social security hospitals
SSK Balıkesir Hastanesi
SSK Bandırma Hastanesi 
SSK Bigadiç Hastanesi
SSK Edremit Hastanesi

Military hospitals
Balıkesir Asker Hastanesi
Edremit Asker Hastanesi

Balikesir
Buildings and structures in Balıkesir Province